Salem Vishnu is a 1990 Tamil-language action film written, produced and directed by Thiagarajan in his directorial debut. The film stars Thiagarajan and Rupini. It was released on 16 February 1990. The film shows the prequel story of the character Salem Vishnu from the Malayalam film New Delhi.

Plot

Vishnu (Thiagarajan) was a clever student, but he cannot tolerate cheating at the school exam, and beats up the professor (M. S. Bhaskar); he was subsequently excluded from the engineering school. He decides to work as a car mechanic. Vishnu and Shanthi (Rupini) fell in love with each other.

Vishnu's brother Siva (R. Sarathkumar) is an honest municipal commissioner. Siva and his wife Lakshmi (Geetha), a jailer, are transferred to the same city where Vishnu lives. They were shocked when Vishnu tells that he is working as a car mechanic.

Kathavarayan (Goundamani), the municipal chairman, and his brother Ashokan (Ratheesh) are corrupted, influential persons. Siva clashes with them. Meantime, Ashokan kills journalist Raji (Vaishnavi), who sends the details of their illegal works to Siva. Ashokan is later sent to jail. Siva wants also to punish Kathavarayan, but Ashokan kills him. The guiltless Vishnu is sent to jail for killing his own brother. In jail, he meets his sister-in-law Lakshmi and his enemy Ashokan. What transpires later forms the crux of the story.

Cast

Thiagarajan as Vishnu
Rupini as Shanthi
R. Sarathkumar as Siva
Geetha as Lakshmi
Ratheesh as Ashokan
Goundamani as Kathavarayan 
Meesai Murugesan as Vishnu's father
S. N. Lakshmi as Vishnu's mother
Vinu Chakravarthy as Jailor Sundaram
Vennira Aadai Moorthy as Muthu
V. K. Ramasamy as Pachai
Vaishnavi as Raji
Jayamalini as Jaya
M. S. Bhaskar as Professor
Omakuchi Narasimhan as Zamindar
Oru Viral Krishna Rao as Lawyer
K. R. Savithri
C. Pravin Kumar as Police officer
Pasi Narayanan as Mechanic
Kullamani as Mechanic
Vellai Subbaiah as Mechanic
Karuppu Subbiah as Mechanic

Soundtrack

The film score and the soundtrack were composed by Sangeetha Rajan. The soundtrack, released in 1990, features 4 tracks with lyrics written by Vaali, Vairamuthu, Kennedy and Thiagarajan.

References

External links

1990 films
1990s Tamil-language films
1990 action films
1990 directorial debut films
Indian action films